Al-Muṭaffifīn (“The Defrauders”) is the eighty-third surah of the Qur'an. It has 36 ayat or verses.

Summary
The primary theme of this surah is Islamic eschatology or the hereafter, and the rhetoric addresses the following subjects is the discourse. The surah opens with a declaration of war and denunciation of those who use false weights and measures in the first six ayat. The surah warns the audience that the acts of the wicked are recorded in the book Sajjín in 7th to 9th ayaat. The surah makes explicit the relation between morality and the doctrine of the Hereafter effectively and impressively with woes to those who reject Muhammad and deny the judgment-day in ayaat up to 17th. Further up to 21st ayat, the surah describes that the acts of the righteous are registered in Illiyún. The rewards of the righteous in Paradise are explained in ayaat 22nd up to 28th. In conclusion, from 29th to the 36th ayat, the believers have been consoled, and the disbelievers warned as if to say: Unbelievers mock at Muslims now but shall be laughed at in turn on the Day of Resurrection.

Ayat (verses)
1-6 Denunciation of those who use false weights and measures
7-9 The acts of the wicked are recorded in the book Sajjín
10-18 Woe to those who reject Muhammad and deny the judgment-day
18-21 The acts of the righteous are registered in Illiyún
22-28 The rewards of the righteous in Paradise
29-36  Unbelievers mock at The Believers now, but shall be laughed at in turn

Name of the surah
Jalaluddin Al-Suyuti co-author of the classical Sunni tafsīr known as Tafsir al-Jalalayn suggests that some of the sūrahs have been named using incipits (i.e. the first few words of the surah). Hamiduddin Farahi a celebrated Islamic scholar of Indian subcontinent is known for his groundbreaking work on the concept of Nazm, or Coherence, in the Quran. He writes that some sūrahs have been given names after some conspicuous words used in them. The Surah takes its name from its second word al-Mutaffifin -Abul A'la Maududi.

Placement and coherence with other surahs
The idea of a textual relation between the verses of a chapter has been discussed under various titles such as nazm and munasabah in non-English literature and coherence, text relations, intertextuality, and unity in English literature. Hamiduddin Farahi, an Islamic scholar of the Indian subcontinent, is known for his work on the concept of nazm, or coherence, in the Quran. Fakhruddin al-Razi (died 1209 CE),  Zarkashi (died 1392) and several other classical as well as contemporary Quranic scholars have contributed to the studies.

This surah belongs to the seventh and final group of surahs which starts from Surah Al-Mulk (67) and runs to the end of the Quran.  This surah forms a pair with the next one (Al-Inshiqaq) about their subject-matter.

Connection with previous surah
Tadabbur-i-Quran is a tafsir (exegeses) of the Qur'an by Amin Ahsan Islahi based on the concept of thematic and structural coherence, which was originally inspired by Allama Hamiduddin Farahi. The tafsir is extended over nine volumes of six thousand pages. It describes Al-Mutaffifin as a supplement to the previous surah al-Infitar concerning the central theme and that this surah elaborates the division righteous and the deviants mentioned in last passage of the previous surah. This surah further continues and elaborates the concept of Islamic eschatology alluded towards the end of previous surah.

Connection with next surah
According to Javed Ahmad Ghamidi a Pakistani Muslim theologian, Quran scholar, Islamic modernist, exegete and educationist; the central theme of both surahs is to warn the Quraysh of any misconception they may have about the Day of Judgement. Most surely, they are going to be raised on that day to appear before their Lord and shall definitely meet different fates according to their deeds.

Special traits of Sūrat Al-Mutaffifin
The Quran consists of 114 chapters of varying lengths, each known as a sūrah. Many of the surahs contain overlapping subjects yet many of them hold special traits. In this surah, for example, the word al-Mutaffifin is unique in its frequency of occurrence as it is mentioned only once in the whole of the Quran. Al-Mutaffifin means the stinters who use unfair means & measures to take more than they should and give less than they should. As the principal subject of the discourse is the stinters/al-Mutaffifin, the surah further elaborates the actions of either; using malpractice or carefully being honest; are recorded in Sajjín and Illiyún respectively. Both of these words Sajjín and Illiyún also occur only in this surah and nowhere else in the whole Quran just like their trigger word Al-Mutaffifin.

Hadith
The first and foremost exegesis/tafsir of the Qur'an is found in hadith of Muhammad. Although scholars including ibn Taymiyyah claim that Muhammad has commented on the whole of the Qur'an, others including Ghazali cite the limited amount of narratives, thus indicating that he has commented only on a portion of the Qur'an. Ḥadīth (حديث) is literally "speech" or "report", that is a recorded saying or tradition of Muhammad validated by isnad; with Sirah Rasul Allah these comprise the sunnah and reveal shariah. According to Aishah, the life of Prophet Muhammad was practical implementation of Qur'an. Therefore, mention in hadith elevates the importance of the pertinent surah from a certain perspective. Ibn Abbas is known for his knowledge of traditions as well as his critical interpretation of the Qur'an. From early on, he gathered information from other companions of Muhammad and gave classes and wrote commentaries. According to him

 "When the Prophet Muhammad came to Al-Madinah, they were the worst people in weights and measures. Then, Allah, Glorious is He revealed: "Woe to the Mutaffifun (those who give less in measure and weight)"(Al-Mutaffifin), and they were fair in weights and measures after that.
 According to Abdullah ibn Masud, Muhammad used to recite two equal surahs in one rak'ah; he would recite (for instance) An-Naziat (79) in one rak'ah, surahs (Al-Mutaffifin) (83) and Sūrat al-ʿAbasa (80) in one rak'ah.

References

External links
Quran 82 Clear Quran translation

Mutaffifin